Saleh Al Sheikh Al Hendi (born 29 May 1982) was a Kuwaiti footballer who played for the Kuwaiti Premier League club Al Qadsia.

References

1982 births
Living people
Kuwaiti footballers
Qadsia SC players
Kuwait international footballers
2011 AFC Asian Cup players
2015 AFC Asian Cup players
Sportspeople from Kuwait City
Association football midfielders
AFC Cup winning players
Kuwait Premier League players